El Salamuni (Psinemoun) is a village in the Upper Egyptian Sohag Governorate. It is located northeast of the city of Akhmim.

Overview
El Salamuni comprises a rock-cut chapel dedicated to the god Min. The edifice was created by the first priest of Min, Nakhtmin. About 1,000 years later, the chief priest of Min, Harma'kheru, added depictions of Ptolemy II Philadelphus.

See also
 List of ancient Egyptian sites, including sites of temples
 Akhmim

References

Populated places in Sohag Governorate